"Crescent Moon" is the fifth episode of the first series of the 1960s British spy-fi television series The Avengers, starring Ian Hendry, Patrick Macnee and Ingrid Hafner, and guest starring Patience Collier, Roger Delgado, Harold Kasket, and Bandana Das Gupta. It was performed and aired live on ABC on 4 February 1961, and is one of many Season 1 episodes that as of 2012 is considered lost.  The episode was directed by John Knight, and written by Geoffrey Bellman and John Whitney.

Plot
A foreign general, General Mendoza, fakes his own death in the belief his wife and associate are plotting to kill him and inherit his fortune. He leaves his country and allows his daughter to be kidnapped, believing that it is in her best interest to be kept out of harm's way. However, it turns out that his daughter has been genuinely kidnapped and must be rescued by Steed while the General is in London recovering under Dr. Keel.

Cast
Ian Hendry as Dr. David Keel
Patrick Macnee as John Steed
Nicholas Amer as Luis Alvarez
Patience Collier as Senora Mendoza
Bandana Das Gupta as Carmelita Mendoza
Roger Delgado as Vasco
Harold Kasket as Bartello
George Roderick as Carlos, an Officer
Jack Rodney as Fernandez
Eric Thompson as Paul

Production
The episode was broadcast live on ABC on 4 February 1961. The production set was designed by Alpho O'Reilly.

References

External links

Episode overview on The Avengers Forever! website

The Avengers (season 1) episodes
Lost television episodes